{{DISPLAYTITLE:Psi2 Piscium}}

Psi2 Piscium (ψ2 Piscium) is a white-hued star in the zodiac constellation of Pisces. It is faintly visible to the naked eye, having an apparent visual magnitude of +5.56. Based upon an annual parallax shift of 8.66 mas as seen from Earth, it is located about 380 light years from the Sun.

References

A-type main-sequence stars
Piscium, Psi2
Pisces (constellation)
Durchmusterung objects
Piscium, 079
006695
005310
0328